The 1919–20 season was the 23rd in the history of the Western Football League in South West England.

This was the first season after the end of World War I, which had halted all organised football in the United Kingdom for several years. A number of new clubs joined the league and a second division was formed. Several clubs had not rejoined the league after the war. The Division One champions this season were Douglas, in their first season in the league. Champions of Division Two were Frome Town, although it was Yeovil and Petters United that were promoted to Division One.

Clubs
Eleven new clubs joined the league, and they were split into two divisions along with those clubs which had returned to the league after the war.

Division One
Division One consisted of ten clubs: Bath City, Bristol Rovers Reserves and Welton Rovers, plus seven new clubs:
Barry Reserves
Bristol City Reserves, rejoining the league after leaving in 1911
Douglas
Horfield United
Newport County Reserves
Swansea Town Reserves
Swindon Town Reserves, rejoining the league after leaving in 1905

Division Two
Division Two consisted of eight clubs: Paulton Rovers, Peasedown St John, Street and Trowbridge Town, plus four new clubs:
Frome Town
Glastonbury
Timsbury Athletic
Yeovil and Petters United

References

1919-20
1919–20 in Welsh football
1919–20 in English football leagues